Tihana Ambroš (born 7 June 1980 in Vinkovci, Croatia) is a Croatian handball player and a member of Croatia women's national handball team playing on pivot position.

Since 1999 Ambroš represents Croatia on World Women's Handball Championships and European Women's Handball Championships - last time on 2008 European Women's Handball Championship where Croatia won 6th place.

Ambroš' best results in EHF Women's Champions League are semi-finals (3rd place) in 2006 and quarter-finals (5th place) in 2009.

Trophies

Spanish Championship (2007)
Spanish Supercup (2006, 2007)
Croatian Championship (1999, 2000, 2001)
Croatian Cup (1999, 2000, 2001)
Montenegrin Championship (2009)
Montenegrin Cup (2009)
Bronze Medal on 2005 Mediterranean Games in Almeria...

Former clubs

Podravka Koprivnica
Astroc Sagunto (BM Sagunto)
Cementos La Union Ribarroja
ŽRK Budućnost T-Mobile

References

1980 births
Living people
Croatian female handball players
Sportspeople from Vinkovci